Peter John Farrell (born 10 January 1957) is an English former football player and coach.

He started his career as a midfielder with Bury in 1975, before he made a £40,000 move to Port Vale in 1978. Loaned out to Doncaster Rovers and Shrewsbury Town in 1981, he joined Rochdale in 1982. He transferred to Crewe Alexandra in 1985, before he finished his career at non-league Barrow after a short tour of Europe. During this tour he played for Västra Frölunda (Sweden), Norrby (Sweden), Keflavík (Iceland), Hamilton Academical (Scotland), and APOEL (Cyprus). He later spent ten years as a coach at Bolton Wanderers, and two years as a coach at Brentford. He was appointed manager of Warri Wolves (Nigeria) in February 2016, before briefly returning to former club Port Vale as a coach four months later.

Playing career
Farrell played for Ormskirk, before turning professional at Third Division Bury in 1975. Under Bobby Smith, the "Shakers" posted mid-table finishes in 1975–76 and 1976–77, before continuing to finish an equally uneventful 1977–78 campaign in mid-table under the management of Bob Stokoe. During his three years at the club Farrell made 54 league appearances, scoring nine goals.

Farrell joined Dennis Butler's Port Vale for a then-club record fee of £40,000 in November 1978. He became a regular in the Fourth Division side, but was soon 'castigated' by Vale fans. He finished 1978–79 with four goals in 29 games. The "Valiants" avoided finishing second-from-bottom in 1979–80 following two wins in the final two games of the campaign – despite this Farrell scored five goals in 33 games, and Vale won in each of the five games in which he scored. There was also a managerial merry-go-round at Vale Park, as Butler was replaced by Alan Bloor and then John McGrath. Farrell made thirty appearances in 1980–81, scoring twice, but found himself dropped by McGrath in February.

He went on loan to Third Division Doncaster Rovers in August 1981 and Second Division Shrewsbury Town in October of that year. However, he did not make a league appearances for either side, and played just four games for Vale in 1981–82. He was given a free transfer in May 1982, and signed with Rochdale.

Under manager Peter Madden, the "Dale" finished 1982–83 outside of the re-election zone on goal difference, after Blackpool were deducted two points. Rochdale finished third-from-bottom in 1983–84 under new manager Jimmy Greenhoff, but their peers voted them back into the Football League. The club improved under Vic Halom's stewardship, and finished seventeenth in 1984–85, still only three points above the re-election zone. During these difficult times Farrell played 73 league games, hitting seventeen goals.

He joined Crewe Alexandra for the 1985–86 campaign, playing 28 league games for Dario Gradi's side, scoring four goals. He then moved to Sweden before he switched to Frank Upton's Icelandic outfit IBK Keflavík, playing 25 games in the Úrvalsdeild, scoring four goals. He later flew to Scotland to play three games for Hamilton Academical. After playing for APOEL in Cyprus, he retired after a spell with English non-league side Barrow.

Coaching and managerial career
From the turn of the century Farrell played a role in youth development at Bolton Wanderers. In ten years he worked his way up from under-18 coach to assistant academy director. In July 2011, he was appointed as first team coach at Brentford by manager Uwe Rösler. Following Rösler's departure to Wigan Athletic on 7 December 2013, Farrell left the club nine days later. He returned to football as manager of Nigeria Premier League side Warri Wolves in February 2016. He was appointed as first team coach at former club Port Vale in June 2016, working under new manager Bruno Ribeiro. However, he never actually signed a contract with the club or took a day's training leaving chairman Norman Smurthwaite to explain that "...it is just not geographically possible and it has put a lot of pressure on him, so Peter is now not going to be part of the future". Farrell did not find out about the club's change of heart until he heard it reported on the radio, and said "It would have been more respectful if someone had the decency to ring me up rather than leave it for 10 days".

Career statistics

References

1957 births
Living people
Footballers from Liverpool
English footballers
Association football midfielders
Bury F.C. players
Port Vale F.C. players
Doncaster Rovers F.C. players
Shrewsbury Town F.C. players
Rochdale A.F.C. players
Crewe Alexandra F.C. players
English expatriate footballers
Expatriate footballers in Sweden
Norrby IF players
Västra Frölunda IF players
Expatriate footballers in Iceland
English expatriate sportspeople in Iceland
Knattspyrnudeild Keflavík players
Hamilton Academical F.C. players
Expatriate footballers in Cyprus
APOEL FC players
Barrow A.F.C. players
English Football League players
Scottish Football League players
National League (English football) players
Cypriot First Division players
British expatriates in Nigeria
English expatriate football managers
Warri Wolves F.C. managers
Nigeria Professional Football League managers
Association football coaches
Bolton Wanderers F.C. non-playing staff
Brentford F.C. non-playing staff
Port Vale F.C. non-playing staff